Gluckstein may refer to:

People
Daniel Gluckstein (born 1953), French politician
Donny Gluckstein (born 1954), British historian
Gluck (Hannah Gluckstein), (1895-1978), British painter
Isidore Gluckstein, (1851-1920), British businessman and co-founder of J. Lyons and Co.
Isidore Montague Gluckstein, 1890–1975, British businessman, son of Montague Gluckstein
Louis Gluckstein (1897–1979), British lawyer and politician
Montague Gluckstein (1854-1922), British businessmanand and co-founder of J. Lyons and Co.
Montague Isidore Gluckstein (1886-1958), British businessman, son of Isidore Gluckstein
Samuel Gluckstein, (1880-1958), British lawyer and politician
Samuel Gluckstein (1821–1873), Prussian-born British businessman, founder of Salmon & Gluckstein
Steven Gluckstein (born 1990), American trampoline athlete
Yigael Gluckstein, generally known as Tony Cliff, Palestinian Trotskyist theorist

Other
Salmon & Gluckstein, British tobacconist